Iram Hassan Bajwa (born 7 May 1980) is a Pakistani politician who was a Member of the Provincial Assembly of the Punjab, from May 2013 to May 2018.

Early life and education
She was born on 7 May 1980 in Lahore.

She earned Master of Arts in Human Resource Management in 2005 from University of the Punjab.

Political career

She was elected to the Provincial Assembly of the Punjab as a candidate of Pakistan Muslim League (N) on a reserved seat for women in 2013 Pakistani general election.

References

Living people
Punjab MPAs 2013–2018
Women members of the Provincial Assembly of the Punjab
1980 births
Pakistan Muslim League (N) politicians
21st-century Pakistani women politicians